Pandamatenga Airport  is an airstrip serving Pandamatenga, a town in the North-West District of Botswana. Pandamatenga is on Botswana's border with Zimbabwe.

See also

Transport in Botswana
List of airports in Botswana

References

External links 
OpenStreetMap - Pandamatenga
OurAirports - Pandamatenga
FallingRain - Pandamatenga Airport

Airports in Botswana
North-West District (Botswana)